Devendra Sharma (born 20 March 1953) is a former Indian cricket umpire. He stood in five ODI games between 1997 and 2002. In 2011 he was removed from umpiring by the ICC following unprofessional conduct.

See also
 List of One Day International cricket umpires

References

1953 births
Living people
Indian One Day International cricket umpires
People from Delhi